Cyperus pseuderemicus is a species of sedge that is native to parts of the Arabian Peninsula.

See also 
 List of Cyperus species

References 

pseuderemicus
Plants described in 2005
Flora of Saudi Arabia
Flora of Oman